Towanda Township is located in McLean County, Illinois. As of the 2010 census, its population was 1,296 and it contained 555 housing units. It contains the entirety of the town of Towanda and a portion of the town of Normal.

Geography

Demographics

References

External links
City-data.com
Illinois State Archives

Townships in McLean County, Illinois
Townships in Illinois